Banana pudding (sometimes banana cream pudding) is a pudding generally consisting of layers of sweet vanilla flavored custard, vanilla wafers and/or ladyfingers and sliced fresh bananas placed in a dish and served, topped with whipped cream or meringue.

It is commonly associated with Southern US cuisine, but it can be found around the country and specific areas.  Furthermore, it closely resembles an English trifle in that it is assembled in layers and includes custard, fruit, sponge cake, and whipped cream.

Banana pudding can be prepared using a baked or refrigerated method, with the latter being the more popular, particularly among home cooks. Moreover, many recipes have been adapted using vanilla or banana pudding instead of a true custard. Other recipes omit the wafers.

Method of preparation
A typical method for making banana pudding is to repeatedly layer the bananas, custard, and wafers into a dish and top with whipped cream or meringue. Over time, the wafers will absorb the custard and the layers will press together causing the flavors to intermingle.

National Banana Pudding Festival
The National Banana Pudding Festival is held at the Centerville River Park in Centerville, Tennessee. It is a 2-day event held on the first weekend of October.

See also

 Banana bread
 Banana custard
 Banana Foster
 Bánh chuối
 List of banana dishes
 List of custard desserts
 Summer pudding
 Tipsy cake
 Trifle

References

American desserts
Puddings
Custard desserts
Cuisine of the Southern United States
Banana dishes
Thanksgiving food